Puzdrowo  is a village in the administrative district of Gmina Sierakowice, within Kartuzy County, Pomeranian Voivodeship, in northern Poland. It is located in the ethnocultural region of Kashubia in the historic region of Pomerania.

The village has a population of 810.

History
Puzdrowo was a private village of Polish nobility, administratively located in the Mirachowo County in the Pomeranian Voivodeship of the Kingdom of Poland.

During the German occupation of Poland (World War II), in 1939, some Poles from Puzdrowo were among the victims of a massacre committed by the Germans in nearby Kaliska as part of the genocidal Intelligenzaktion campaign.

References

Villages in Kartuzy County